Agonopterix rimulella is a moth of the family Depressariidae. It is found in the Russian Far East, north-eastern China and Japan.

References

Moths described in 1920
Agonopterix
Moths of Asia